Avengers World is an ongoing comic series that was published by Marvel Comics as part of the third wave of Marvel NOW!, from January 2014 until July 2015.

Publication history

Spencer said, "What the book is all about is really in the title. This is a book about geography. It's about what Marvel Earth looks like now. Obviously we've seen the Avengers make a pretty big statement about this world being under their protection and them being the representatives of our world. So it felt like it was time to do a book about what that planet looks like; not just Marvel New York or Marvel Space, but what does Marvel Europe, Asia and Africa look like right now? So it was a chance to do a story that was really global in scope and go some places that maybe we haven't been to before and really play with the idea of what that changing landscape would look like."

Plot
Starting out with Steve Rogers and Bruce Banner strolling down corridors within the S.H.I.E.L.D. Helicarrier Iliad, they soon arrive in the presence of current head of S.H.I.E.L.D Director Maria Hill. Discussing matters involving the cooperation between the Avengers and S.H.I.E.L.D regarding the peacekeeping of national and global security. First order of business was the sudden emergence of an unusual string of natural disasters brewing all up and down the eastern seaboard, to which Hyperion, Thor, Captain Marvel were able to answer the call for help in Regina, Canada. Elsewhere, a massive full-scale riot has broken out over all of Madripoor with the only calm (including well guarded) zone being a strange temple housed by Gorgon and the Hand whom are enacting a strange ritual which raises the island out of the water up upon the head of a massive beast....a dragon that is as large as an island continent. Black Widow, Falcon, Shang-Chi, and Wolverine are sent to Madripoor. Hawkeye, Nightmask, Spider-Woman, and Star Brand are sent to investigate massive disappearances in Velletri, Italy. Meanwhile, A.I.M.'s Scientist Supreme Andrew Forson uses an unknown device accelerated the flow of time in the limits of the A.I.M. Island, creating in a matter of hours for the real world years of progress and transforming A.I.M. into a technologically advanced empire. When the source of mysterious seismic events was revealed to be A.I.M. Island, Smasher went to investigate along with Cannonball and Sunspot. When they arrived to the location, they were captured by the A.I.M. Troopers. This leaves Steve Rogers and Bruce Banner to deliver the course of action against this.

Smasher is trying to break out of a containment cell whilst Andrew Forson and another A.I.M. agent look on. The agent comments that Sunspot and Cannonball are in their infirmary and will be treated while bringing up Smasher's connections with the Shi'ar. He then hints that they can make them useful to A.I.M. Andrew does not want this and tells the agent just to keep them contained. The agent informs the Scientist Supreme that Izzy is not just an Avenger but also a Sh'iar Superguardian. Andrew likes this and orders her release, saying she will be his "messenger." Meanwhile, on the S.H.I.E.L.D. Helicarrier Iliad, Bruce Banner is briefing Captain America, Maria Hill and some other S.H.I.E.L.D. Agents on the A.I.M. Island situation....how it has grown considerably and although it's outward growth has now stopped, it is still getting taller. Bruce also states that the technology A.I.M. has is way ahead of theirs and he is still trying to figure out what kind of containment field A.I.M. has set up to hold Smasher and the others. Captain America orders Thor's team to go and help. Back on the island, Smasher finally gets out of her cell and discovers an alien-looking garden outside. She tries to brush it off as nothing as she's been to other planets before. Andrew Forson approaches Izzy leading to her taking an aggressive stance, but to her surprise he apologizes and says they did not mean to attack and it was out of confusion due to the recent growth of A.I.M. Island. He tells her that her teammates are being cared for and they can leave at any time. However, before they go he wants to show her something. He tells Smasher that the island's growth was necessary to protect themselves for what is to come. As they tour the garden, Andrew says that a being that has seen the end of the universe lives there and that he opened A.I.M.'s eyes to allow them to better mankind. Andrew Forson's speech mentions an end to all sickness, which strikes a chord with Smasher who lost her grandfather to illness. Smasher is then stung by an alien bug and her body begins to change. Andrew explains this change is to prepare her for what is to come and they are then approached by the being who has seen the end of the Universe....Jude the Entropic Man. He tells Izzy the truth behind all things....that everything dies. Izzy does not want this and the Scientist Supreme says she will tell the world of this as their Messenger. Izzy stands ready in a new golden uniform.

After taking out all of the present Hand ninjas, Shang-Chi challenges the Gorgon. Shang-Chi has done his homework and, knowing the Gorgon's gaze can turn a man to stone, extinguishes all the torches with a clap of his hands to cover their fight with darkness. The Gorgon counters by setting the temple ablaze, arguing that it can be restored but Shang Chi can not. Shang fights well, using the weapons he received from Tony Stark and turning the Gorgon's attacks against him. Shang Chi also draws on the attributes from some noble warriors that have come before him. However, just as the warriors that preceded him eventually fell, the same happens to Shang with the Gorgon getting the upper hand and beating him. The Gorgon praises Shang Chi, saying he fought valiantly but it was not enough. Gorgon then throws Shang-Chi from the edge of Madripoor.

Hawkeye, Nightmask, Spider-Woman, and Star Brand are exploring their surroundings in Velletai trying to ascertain where they are. Nightmask is concerned for Star Brand and the voices he is hearing. Spider-Woman and Hawkeye are just concerned that Star Brand is cracking up. Suddenly, dark beings rise out of the nearby "river" and start attacking. The Avengers defend themselves, but Star Brand is distracted by a voice calling his name. It's his former classmate Kelly Overton. He chases after her but finds himself back in his old high school. Back on S.H.I.E.L.D. Helicarrier Iliad, Bruce Banner is criticizing Steve Rogers. There are so many Avengers and none of them are magical. However, Maria Hill has called in Sebastian Druid (the son of Doctor Druid and formerly one of Nick Fury's Secret Warriors) for magical support. He's astral projecting from Nepal. After discovering the Avengers team is trapped in a city of the dead, he recommends a plane be sent for him. He explains that cities of the dead are spirit traps built by the Cult of Entropy where lost tormented souls gather and are unable to move on to the next realm. However, the power of these cities grew beyond the control of the Cult of Entropy and only those strong in magic have any chance of survival within one. Back in Velletai, Star Brand discovers that the souls present are the victims of the disaster caused when he got his powers. Begging for forgiveness, he is carried before their ruler Morgan le Fay.

As Bruce Banner discusses how to drop the rescue party on A.I.M. Island, he avoids questions from the S.H.I.E.L.D. Agents present about his control over Hulk. Meanwhile, Iron Man tries to get Manifold to teleport Thor's group into A.I.M. Island. Manifold states that he is still trying to get control of his powers. In order to find his center, Manifold turns to Captain Universe for help. Afterwards, Manifold manages to teleport Thor's group to A.I.M. Island.<ref>Avengers World #5</ref>

Upon arriving at A.I.M. Island, Thor, Hyperion, and Captain Marvel recall on how Hyperion was brought to A.I.M. Island following the destruction of his universe. Captain Marvel then tells Thor and Hyperion about the approaching A.I.M. Agents that are flying as they fight their way through.

As Black Widow and Wolverine are fighting the rioters on Madripoor, Falcon is looking for Shang-Chi as Gorgon makes plans to use the dragon to attack China. Falcon continues his search for Shang-Chi until he comes across the Chinese intelligence-gathering agency S.P.E.A.R. where he meets their director Xian Zheng on the S.P.E.A.R. base called the Circle which Xian Zheng showed Falcon around. While Xian Zheng was talking with Falcon, the Circle comes under attack by some Hand Ninjas on flying dragons. Xian Zheng quotes to Falcon "This battle will be our moment in time. When the world sets itself right. This is order restored. As it always has been, as it always should be. The shield in the west-- The spear in the East. Together we must answer this challenge, and prove ourselves worthy." To combat the Hand Ninjas, S.P.E.A.R. deploys their own superhuman response team called the Ascendants (consisting of Devastator III, Monkey King, Sabre III, Vector II, and Weather Witch) before the Hand can make it into China.

Collected editionsAvengers World'' has been collected in the following trade paperbacks:

References

2014 comics debuts
Avengers (comics) titles